Weinreich is a surname. Notable people with the surname include:

Andrew Weinreich, American serial entrepreneur
Bernd Weinreich (born 1948), composer, musicologist (de)
Frank Weinreich (born 1962), German author (de)
Gustav Weinreich (1886–1980), Danish furniture maker (da)
Hans Weinreich (1480/1490 – 1566), Polish printer
Jens Weinreich (born 1965), German sport-journalist (de)
Justus Weinreich (1858–1927), German composer and musician
Kurt Weinreich (1908–1998), German football manager, head coach of the Finland national football team
Manfred Weinreich (born 1946), German rower who represented West Germany
Max Weinreich (1893/94, Kuldīga – 1969), Jewish-Latvian linguist specializing in Yiddish
Uriel Weinreich (1926–1967), Jewish-American linguist specializing in Yiddish
Otto Weinreich (1886–1972), Jewish German classical philologist (de)
Regina Weinreich, writer, journalist, teacher
Torben Weinreich (born 1946), Danish professor (no)

See also 
Weinrich
Reichwein

German-language surnames
Jewish surnames
Yiddish-language surnames